Ledinghem is a commune in the Pas-de-Calais department in the Hauts-de-France region of France.

Geography
Ledinghem is situated 12 miles (19 km) southwest of Saint-Omer, on the D128 road.

Population

Places of interest
 The church of St. Folquin, dating from the seventeenth century.
 The remains (motte and moat) of an old chateau.

See also
Communes of the Pas-de-Calais department

References

Communes of Pas-de-Calais